Penseroso Bluff is a prominent bluff (1,945 m) surmounting the narrow, northern neck of the Daniels Range, 10 nautical miles (18 km) northeast of Mount Nero, in the Usarp Mountains. The Northern Party of the New Zealand Geological Survey Antarctic Expedition (NZGSAE), 1963–64, reached this bluff in gloomy weather. The feature appeared dark and sombre; hence, the party gave the name from Milton's "Il Penseroso" in antithesis to Allegro Valley 14 miles to the south.

Cliffs of Victoria Land
Pennell Coast